T. W. Thompson (1888–1968) was an English collector of folklore, specialising in the 'Gypsy' people of the Lake District. His papers were read before the Folklore Society and published in the journal of the Gypsy Lore Society.

Describing himself as a 'gypsiologist', his interest in language and genealogy of this field began at Cambridge. He took a position in Repton as a teacher and began collecting folktales of the Romani people. Thompson made careful and extensive notes during his research, using multiple sources to determine the persistent elements from the variations. His records accounted for the creation of new tales by his informants and the reworking of elements in their telling. His large and mostly unpublished records are now held at the Bodleian Library and regarded as significant resource for Romani studies.

External link 

 Archival Material at Leeds University Library

References

1888 births
1968 deaths
English folklorists